Smith Edward Lane (July 22, 1829 – February 1, 1909) was appointed commissioner of the New York City Department of Parks and Recreation in 1880.

Biography
Smith E. Lane was born in New York on July 22, 1829.

He entered New York University at age 14, and graduated in 1848. He was admitted to the bar in 1852, and practiced as a lawyer.

He was appointed commissioner of the New York City Department of Parks and Recreation by Smith Ely, Jr. in 1880. He died in poverty at his apartment at 227 West Sixty-eighth Street in Manhattan, New York City on February 1, 1909.

References

1829 births
1909 deaths
Lawyers from New York City
New York City Department of Parks and Recreation
New York University alumni